Bear Lake may refer to several places:

Lakes

Canada 
 Bear Lake (Bear River), a lake in the northwestern Omineca Country of the North-Central Interior of British Columbia, part of the Skeena River drainage via the Bear and Sustut Rivers (there are six other Bear Lakes in British Columbia)
 Great Bear Lake, eighth largest lake in the world, largest in Northwest Territories
 Bear Lake (Ontario), one of 29 Bear Lakes in Ontario
 Bear Lake (Halifax Regional Municipality, Nova Scotia), one of 16 lakes in Nova Scotia
 Bear Lake (Colchester County, Nova Scotia)

United States 
 Bear Lake (Alaska), a lake near the town of Seward and Resurrection Bay
 Bear Lake (Colorado), in Rocky Mountain National Park
 Bear Lake (Idaho), an alpine lake in Custer County
 Bear Lake (Idaho–Utah), along the Idaho–Utah border, first called Black Bear Lake
 Bear Lake (Michigan), a lake in Kalkaska County
 Bear Lake (Muskegon County, Michigan), which abuts Muskegon, Michigan
 Bear Lake in Beaverhead County, Montana
 Bear Lake in Lincoln County, Montana
 Bear Lake in Powell County, Montana
 Bear Lake in Sanders County, Montana
 Bear Lake (Chautauqua County, New York), a lake north of Kelly Corners, New York
 Bear Lake (Herkimer County, New York), a lake near McKeever, New York
 Bear Lake (Oregon), there are at least 8 Bear Lakes in Oregon
 Bear Lake (Washington), a lake in King County
 Big Bear Lake, a reservoir in San Bernardino County, California
 Little Bear Lake, a lake in McLeod County, Minnesota

Romania 
 Bear Lake (Romania) (Lacul Ursu), a lake in Sovata

Counties, cities, towns, townships, parks

Canada 
 Bear Lake, British Columbia, a settlement to the north of the city of Prince George, British Columbia
 Bear Lake (Fort Connelly), a settlement on the lake of the same name, north of Fort Babine, British Columbia
 Bear Lake 4, an Indian Reserve in British Columbia, on the lake of the same name north of Fort Babine
 Bear Lake, Ontario

United States 
 Bear Lake County, Idaho
 Bear Lake State Park (Idaho)
 Bear Lake State Park (Utah)
 Bear Lake, Kalkaska County, Michigan
 Bear Lake Township, Kalkaska County, Michigan
 Bear Lake Township, Manistee County, Michigan
 Bear Lake, Michigan, a village in Manistee County
 Bear Lake, Indiana, a lakeside community
 Bear Lake, Pennsylvania, a borough in Warren County
 Bear Lake, Rusk County, Wisconsin, an unincorporated community
 Bear Lake, Wisconsin, a town
 Big Bear Lake, California, a city in San Bernardino County
 White Bear Lake Township, Pope County, Minnesota
 White Bear Lake, Minnesota, a city in Ramsey County

See also
 
 White Bear Lake (disambiguation)
 Bear River (disambiguation)
 Bear Creek (disambiguation)
 Bear Brook (disambiguation)